Sabarimala stampede may refer to:

1999 Sabarimala stampede, a stampede at Sabarimala in January 1999.
2011 Sabarimala stampede, a stampede at Sabarimala in January 2011.